The Nokia 6130 is a mobile phone released in 1998 by Nokia.

References

Mobile phones introduced in 1998
6130
Mobile phones with infrared transmitter